Halva (also halvah, halwa, and other spellings) is a type of confectionery originating from Persia and widely spread throughout the Middle East and India. The name is used for a broad variety of recipes, generally a thick paste made from flour, butter, liquid oil, saffron, rosewater, milk, cocoa powder, and sweetened with sugar.

Halva is popular in Iran, India, the Middle East, and Greece.

Etymology

History
Halva originated in Persia (modern day Iran).
A reference to halvah appeared in the 7th century, referring to a mixture of mashed dates with milk. By the 9th century, the term was applied to numerous kinds of sweets, including the now-familiar sweetened cooked semolina or flour paste.

Many of the earlier Persian recipes were documented in the 13th century Arabic book Kitab al-Tabikh (The Book of Dishes), as well as an anonymous cookbook from 13th-century Moorish Spain. Halva was adopted by the Ottoman Turks, including a sesame-based version, and spread throughout their empire.

Types
Most types of halva are relatively dense confections sweetened with sugar or honey. Their textures, however, vary. For example, semolina-based halva's texture can be like a very buttery, moist clumpy couscous to something gelatinous and translucent, while sesame-based halva is drier and more crumbly.

Grain-based halva

Grain-based halva is made by toasting flour or cornstarch in oil, mixing it into a roux, and then cooking it with a sugary syrup. Corn is rarely used.

The semolina is first toasted in fat, either oil or butter, to which water or milk, and sugar is added as desired to create the preferred taste and consistency. 

Dairy-based rice flour halva, known as Pathein halawa, is considered a Burmese delicacy native to the city of Pathein.

Sesame
Sesame halva is popular in the Balkans, Poland, Middle East, and other areas surrounding the Mediterranean Sea. The primary ingredients in this confection are sesame butter or paste (tahini), and sugar, glucose or honey. Soapwort (called ‘erq al halaweh in Arabic;  in Turkish), egg white, or marshmallow root are added in some recipes to stabilize the oils in the mixture or create a distinctive texture for the resulting confection. Other ingredients and flavorings, such as pistachio nuts, cocoa powder, orange juice, vanilla, or chocolate are often added to the basic tahini and sugar base.

Sunflower

Sunflower halva is popular in the countries of the former Soviet Union as well as in Bulgaria and Romania. It is made of roasted ground sunflower seeds instead of sesame. It may include other ingredients, such as nuts, cocoa powder, or vanilla. In 1996 around 4–5 thousand tonnes of sunflower halva were being produced by Ukraine annually.

Peanuts
In Argentina, Greek immigrants at the beginning of the 20th century created a kind of halva called mantecol from peanut butter, currently marketed under the name of Mantecol and also Nucrem. Such a product is widely consumed in the country.

Other

Floss halva
Pişmaniye (Turkish) or floss halva is a traditional sweet, prepared in Kocaeli, Turkey, made by flossing thin strands of halva into a light confection. Made primarily of wheat flour and sugar, the strands are continuously wrapped into a ball shape and then compressed. The result is a halva with a light consistency, similar to cotton candy. Floss halva can be found in regular and pistachio flavors, and there are brands with halal or kosher certifications.

A similar chickpea-based, version of floss halva is popular in North India. It tends to be slightly denser and is often referred to as patisa or sohan papdi. In Chinese cuisine, a floss-like candy similar to pismaniye or pashmak halva, known as dragon beard candy, is eaten as a snack or dessert.

A raw version of halva also has become popular among proponents of raw food diets. In this version, a mixture of raw sesame tahini, raw almonds, raw agave nectar and salt are blended together and frozen to firm.

Cultural use 
Halva can be a snack or served as part of a meal.

Azerbaijan
 
One regional variant is from Sheki where Şəki halvası halva refers to a layered bakhlava style pastry filled with spiced-nut mix and topped by crisscrossed patterns of a red syrup made from saffron, dried carrot and beetroot.

Greece
Halva is a traditional fasting food among Greek Orthodox who traditionally have food restrictions, especially from meat, on Wednesdays and Fridays throughout the year, for all of Great Lent and other fasting periods.

India

India has many types of halva, some unique to particular regions of the country. It is one of the popular sweets of India usually made from semolina.

The town of Bhatkal in Coastal Karnataka is famous for its unique Banana Halwa which is infused with either whole cashews, pistachio or almonds. This type of authentic halwas are a specialty of the Muslims of this town.

It is speculated that Halva (or Halwa) is associated with Indian traditions and culture, written records of sweets from Mānasollāsa indicate that semolina halvas, the most popular form of halvas in India, were already known in India, for instance, it mentions a sweet called shali-anna which is a semolina based sweet today known as Kesari in South India.

Tirunelveli in Tamil Nadu is known for its wheat halwa. Its preparation is a laborious process that "is slowly seeing this sweet disappear." Unlike other sweets, the extra ghee is not drained out but forms an outer layer. This increases the shelf life of the halwa. The unique taste of the halwa is attributed to the perennial Thamirabranai.

The history of Kozhikode Halwa in Kerala could trace back to Zamorin era. Zamorin invited chefs from Gujarat to prepare halwa for their royal feast. They were also granted places to stay beside royal kitchen. This settlement later evolved as sweet sellers street, nowadays known as SM (Sweet Meat) Street or Mittayitheruvu. Kozhikode halwa is made of pure coconut oil, not from ghee. Kozhikode halwa also builds religious harmony; Ayyappa devotees from neighboring states Karnataka and Andhra Pradesh buy halwa and chips like prasadam (sacred food). They distribute them among their neighbors and friends, who consume them with a religious zeal.

Iran
In Iran, halva usually refers to a related confection made from wheat flour and butter and flavored with saffron and rose water. The final product has a yellow color or brown color or dark brown color. The halva is spread thin on a plate till it dries into a paste. Halva usually is served at wedding celebrations, religious ceremonies and funerals.

Halva Ardeh is the Iranian term for tahini-based halva, and may or may not include whole pistachios. Ardeh is processed sesame in the form of paste, usually sweetened with syrup.

Israel

Tahini halvah is very popular in Israel and among Jewish people throughout the diaspora. Spelled "halvah" in English, it usually comes in slabs, nearly-cylindrical cakes (illustrated), or small packages, and is available in a wide variety of flavours, chocolate and vanilla being very common. The halvah is almost always parve. Israeli halvah will usually not contain wheat flour or semolina, but will contain sesame tahini, glucose, sugar, vanilla and Saponaria officinalis (soapwort) root extracts, which are not usually found in other recipes. It is often served as a breakfast component at Israeli hotels, though it is not usually part of an Israeli breakfast, and it is even used in specialty ice cream.

Myanmar (Burma)

In Myanmar (Burma), halawa generally refers to Pathein halawa, a Burmese confection or mont made with glutinous rice flour, rice flour, milk, and coconut shavings originating from the Irrawaddy delta town of Pathein. Another popular semolina-based confection, which is known as sooji halawa in India, is called sanwin makin in Myanmar.

United States
Halva can be found in ethnic Indian, Jewish, Arab, Persian, Greek, Balkan, and Turkish community stores and delicatessens. It is increasingly offered by upscale restaurants in some areas. Besides being imported, it is manufactured in the United States, with the largest producer being Brooklyn-originated Joyva.

Turkey
In Turkey halva is served for special occasions such as births, circumcisions, weddings and religious gatherings. The tradition is for semolina halva to be served at funerals, when someone leaves or returns from Hajj, and during Ramadan. 

For this reason, flour (un) halva is also called in Turkish , meaning "halva of the dead". The expression "roasting halva for someone" suggests that the person referred to has died.

See also

 List of desserts
 Mahim halwa
 Barfi
 Aluwa

References

Confectionery
Desserts
Arab cuisine
Vegetarian cuisine
Arab desserts
Balkan cuisine
Burmese desserts and snacks
Iranian desserts
Israeli desserts
Israeli confectionery
Jewish desserts
Levantine cuisine
Ottoman cuisine
South Asian cuisine
Uzbekistani cuisine
Tajik cuisine
Turkish desserts
Halva
Bulgarian cuisine
Greek cuisine
Semolina dishes
Ancient dishes
Lenten foods
Breakfast
Albanian cuisine